The Trinity College Chapel is a Collegiate Gothic structure built in 1933 on the campus of Trinity College in Hartford, Connecticut. It was designed by Philip H. Frohman of the firm Frohman, Robb and Little, who also designed the National Cathedral in Washington D.C.

Organ

Gallery

References

Churches completed in 1933
Churches in Hartford, Connecticut
Collegiate Gothic architecture in the United States
Trinity College (Connecticut)
University and college chapels in the United States